Arthur Herman (1871–1955) was a Major League Baseball pitcher. He played for the Louisville Colonels of the National League in 1896 and 1897. He played in the minor leagues through 1906.

External links

1871 births
1955 deaths
Major League Baseball pitchers
Baseball players from Louisville, Kentucky
Louisville Colonels players
19th-century baseball players
Nashville Seraphs players
Rochester Blackbirds players
Minneapolis Millers (baseball) players
Atlanta Colts players
St. Joseph Saints players
Omaha Omahogs players
Milwaukee Brewers (minor league) players
Nashville Vols players